Parapionosyllis is a genus of polychaete annelids, first described by Pierre Fauvel in 1923.

References

Further reading
 Nuchal organs of the polychaete Parapionosyllis manca (Syllidae). GA Lewbart, NW Riser; Invertebrate Biology, 1996
 Sphaerosyllis and Parapionosyllis (Polychaeta: Syllidae) from Cuba and Florida. G San Martín, Ophelia supplement, 1991
 Parapionosyllis macaronesiensis, a new species of Exogoninae (Polychaeta: Syllidae) from the Macaronesian Region. MD Brito, J Núñez, G San Martín, Proceedings of the Biological Society of …, 2000
 Parapionosyllis at WoRMS

Syllidae
Polychaete genera
Taxa named by Pierre Fauvel
Taxa described in 1923